An Emerald Society is an Irish-American fraternal organization whose members come from law enforcement, fire service, and non-uniform civil service agencies. Each Emerald Society is separate and distinct from the other. Currently, there are two umbrella Emerald organizations: the Grand Council of United Emerald Societies (GCUES), reorganized in 1975 after the merger of the National Grand Council of Irish Emerald Societies and Grand Council of Emerald Societies, and the National Conference of Law Enforcement Emerald Societies (NCLEES), founded in 1995.

The NYPD Emerald Society was founded in 1953, NYCD Emerald Society in 1955, and FDNY Emerald Society in 1956. The GCUES has affiliates in New York City, New York Counties of Nassau, Suffolk, Westchester, Rockland, Orange, Putnam, Ulster, New Jersey, California (Los Angeles County), Massachusetts (Boston), and Washington, District of Columbia. The Emerald movement has grown dramatically since the 1950s, and the GCUES, in particular, has engineered many of those organizations.

Grand Council of United Emerald Societies
National Conference of Law Enforcement Emerald Societies 
NYPD Emerald Society 
NYCD Emerald Society
FDNY Emerald Society
PAPD Emerald Society
DSNY Emerald Society
NYCTA Emerald Society
NYC DOE Emerald Society
NYSCTS Emerald Society
Police Emerald Society of Hudson Valley, New York
Police Emerald Society of Nassau County, New York
Police Emerald Society of Westchester County, New York
Police Emerald Society of Washington DC
Police Emerald Society of Baltimore
Boston Police Emerald Society
Emerald Society the Federal Law Enforcement Agencies 
Essex County Police and Fire Emerald Society
Philadelphia Police and Fire Emerald Society
Los Angeles Police Emerald Society 
Los Angeles County Fire Emerald Society
Emerald Society of Wisconsin
Emerald Society of Illinois 
 Emerald Society of Minnesota
 Emerald Society of the Federal Law Enforcement Agencies
Greater Cincinnati Emerald Society
San Francisco Bay Area Law Enforcement Emerald Society
San Jose Police Emerald Society

References

Ethnic fraternal orders in the United States
Irish-American culture
Law enforcement non-governmental organizations in the United States
Clubs and societies in the United States